Marie Hušková (born 1942) is a Czech mathematician who worked in theoretical statistics and change-point problem. She was a doctoral student of Jaroslav Hájek.

In 2012 she was awarded by title Officer of the Order of Orange-Nassau for long term cooperation with Dutch mathematical statisticians.
She is also a Fellow of the Institute of Mathematical Statistics, and an Elected Member of the International Statistical Institute.

References

20th-century Czech mathematicians
Women statisticians
Officers of the Order of Orange-Nassau
Elected Members of the International Statistical Institute
Fellows of the Institute of Mathematical Statistics
1942 births
Living people
20th-century women mathematicians

Czech statisticians
Czechoslovak mathematicians
21st-century Czech mathematicians